Mequepe (real name Manuel Queirós Pereira) (born 21 November 1947) is a Portuguese rally driver who competed in the WRC. On 14 March 1976 he finished third in the Rallye de Portugal.

External links
eWRC results

1947 births
Living people
Portuguese rally drivers